Coming of Age is the third studio album by the Canadian rock band, the Five Man Electrical Band. It includes the album's biggest hit, "Absolutely Right". As of 2022, the album appears to have not yet been released on compact disc.

Track listing

Personnel
 Les Emmerson - guitars, synthesizer, vocals
 Ted Gerow - keyboards, moog synthesizer, vocals
 Brian Rading - bass, vocals
 Mike Bell - drums, vocals
 Rick Bell - percussion, vocals

1971 albums
Five Man Electrical Band albums
Albums recorded at Sound City Studios